Thoppuviduthy is a village in the Orathanadu taluk of Thanjavur district, Tamil Nadu, India.

Demographics 

As per the 2001 census, Thoppuviduthy had a total population of 2960 with 1456 males and 1504 females. The sex ratio was 1033. The literacy rate was 60.91.

References 

 

Villages in Thanjavur district